Ingeborg of Denmark (1174 – 29 July 1237) was Queen of France by marriage to Philip II of France. She was a daughter of Valdemar I of Denmark and Sofia of Minsk.

Marriage
Ingeborg was married to Philip II Augustus of France on 14 August 1193, after the death of Philip's first wife Isabelle of Hainaut (d. 1190). Her marriage brought a large dowry from her brother King Canute VI of Denmark. Stephen of Tournai described her as "very kind, young of age but old of wisdom."
On the day after his marriage to Ingeborg, King Philip changed his mind, wished to obtain a separation and attempted to send her back to Denmark. Outraged, Ingeborg fled to a convent in Soissons, from where she protested to Pope Celestine III.

Three months after the wedding, Philip summoned an ecclesiastical council in Compiègne and had it draw a false family tree to show that he and Ingeborg would have been related through Philip's first wife. Contemporary Canon law stated that a man and a woman could not marry if they shared an ancestor within the last seven generations. The council therefore declared the marriage void.

Ingeborg protested again and the Danes sent a delegation to meet Pope Celestine III. They convinced him that the spurious family tree was false but the pope merely declared the annulment invalid and prohibited Philip from marrying again. Philip ignored the Pope's verdict.
Ingeborg spent the next 20 years in virtual imprisonment in various French castles. In one stage she spent more than a decade in the castle of Étampes southwest of Paris. Her brother Knud VI and his advisers continually worked against the annulment. Contemporary sources also indicate that many of Philip's advisers in France supported Ingeborg.

Political reasons for this royal marriage are disputed, but Philip probably wanted to gain better relations with Denmark because the countries had been on different sides in the schism of the future succession to the throne of the Holy Roman Empire. Possibly he also wanted more allies against the rival Angevin dynasty. As a dowry, he had asked for the support of the Danish fleet for a year and the right to any remaining claims Denmark had to the throne of England. Ingeborg's brother Knud VI agreed only to a dowry of 10.000 silver marks. Marriage had been negotiated through Philip's adviser Bernard of Vincennes and Guillaume, the abbot of the Danish monastery of Æbelholt.

Her defence
Pope Celestine defended the Queen, but was able to do little for her.  Indeed, Philip asked Pope Celestine III for an annulment on the grounds of non-consummation “per maleficium,” impotence caused by sorcery. (Historians have presented many theories for the alleged lack of consummation from temporary impotence to bouts of sweating sickness). Philip had not reckoned with Ingeborg, however; she insisted that the marriage had been consummated, and that she was his wife and the rightful Queen of France.

The Franco-Danish churchman William of Æbelholt (c. 1127 – 1203) intervened in the case of Philip Augustus who was attempting to repudiate Ingeborg.  The genealogy of the Danish kings which William drew up on this occasion to disprove the alleged impediment of consanguinity and two books of his letters, some of which deal with this affair, have come down to us.

Philip married Agnes of Merania in June 1196. However, in 1198 new Pope Innocent III declared that this new marriage was void because the previous marriage was still valid. He ordered Philip to dismiss Agnes and take Ingeborg back. Ingeborg had written to him, stating abuse and isolation and claiming thoughts of suicide because of harsh treatment.

Philip's response was to lock Ingeborg away in the Château d'Étampes in Essonne.  Locked up in a tower, Ingeborg was a prisoner.  Food was irregular and sometimes insufficient.  No one was allowed to visit her, except for one occasion when two Danish chaplains were allowed to visit. Philip, meanwhile, brought Agnes back, and continued to live with her, producing a second child, a son. For these offences, Philip was excommunicated in 1200, and the kingdom was placed under an interdict. When the king did not comply, Pope Innocent III placed France under interdict in 1199 until September 1200 when Philip said he would obey. He later reneged on that promise. Agnes died the following year.

In 1201 Philip asked the Pope to declare his children legitimate and the Pope complied to gain his political support. However, later that year Philip again asked for an annulment, claiming that Ingeborg had tried to bewitch him in the wedding night and thus made him unable to consummate the marriage. So he asked for divorce on the grounds of witchcraft. This attempt failed as well.

Reconciliation and later life
Philip reconciled with Ingeborg in 1213, not out of altruism but because he wished to press his claims to the throne of the Kingdom of England through his ties to the Danish crown. Later, on his deathbed in 1223, he is said to have told his son Louis VIII to treat her well. Later, both Louis VIII and Louis IX acknowledged Ingeborg as a legitimate queen. After this time, Ingeborg spent most of her time in a priory of Saint-Jean-de-l’Ile  which she had founded. It was close to Corbeil on an island in  Essonne. She survived her husband by more than 14 years.
Ingeborg of Denmark died in either 1237 or 1238 and was buried in the Church of the Order of St John in Corbeil (Église de l'ordre de Saint-Jean à Corbeil).

See also
Ingeborg Psalter

References

Other Sources
Alex Sanmark   The Princess in the Tower (History Today February 2006)
Gérard Morel (1987) Ingeburge, la reine interdite (Payot, collection Les romans de l'Histoire)

External links
 Chateau Prison: Isemburge

1174 births
1237 deaths
French queens consort
House of Estridsen
House of Capet
Repudiated queens
Danish princesses
12th-century Danish people
12th-century Danish women
12th-century French people
12th-century French women
13th-century French people
13th-century French women
13th-century Danish people
13th-century Danish women
Wives of Philip II of France
Daughters of kings